Tears in the Fabric is a 2014 British documentary film directed by Hannan Majid and Richard York. The film documents the toll that the 2013 Rana Plaza disaster has taken on a Bangladeshi garment factory worker named Razia Begum.

Summary
After the Rana Plaza disaster, documentary filmmakers, Hannan Majid and Richard York returned to Bangladesh to make their second film on the plight of garment workers.

The film observes the toll the disaster has taken on one woman named Razia Begum. She lost both her daughters and her son-in-law in Rana Plaza and now struggles to care for her two surviving orphaned grandsons, who have been left without financial support. While having to come to terms with an enormous personal loss, the tragedy rendered Begum and her grandsons homeless – the result of losing her family's livelihood.

Begum is yet to receive any financial compensation from factory management or the major brands. She moves from shelter to shelter each night, with eight-year-old Bijoi and six-year-old Parvez, while fighting for compensation from the brands involved in the disaster. Raising and educating her grandsons, she searches for resolution and answers through protest on the streets of Dhaka and amongst the rubble and torn fabrics of Rana Plaza.

Production
Since the release of the 2010 film The Machinists, Rainbow Collective built strong ties with the National Garment Workers Federation (NGWF), who were instrumental in securing the access and characters for Tears in the Fabric. In February 2014, Rainbow Collective visited Savar, Bangladesh to shoot the documentary.

Release
Tears in the Fabric had its charity premiere in London on 24 April 2014, courtesy of Open Vizor, War on Want, Traid and Rainbow Collective, at Regent's University to raise money for the families of the Rana Plaza victims. The film was also part of the Brick Lane Circle's fourth annual conference.

Reception
Julie Flynn Badal of The Huffington Post said, "Tears in the Fabric, is an intimate portrait of the fall-out from Rana Plaza long after the world has moved on to other news items... a film that is not afraid to look grief squarely in the eye. And that is no small feat in a culture that can so easily go numb to the grim realities behind our consumption."

Tracy McVeigh of The Guardian said about the film, "to press more brands to pay up and sign the Bangladeshi safety accord." Films For Food called the film "...a starkly honest and deeply moving view of the human cost of high street fashion."

Awards and nominations

See also
2013 Savar building collapse

References

External links

Rainbow Collective website
Open Vizor website

2014 films
2014 documentary films
British documentary films
British Bangladeshi films
British independent films
2010s Bengali-language films
Documentary films about disasters
Documentary films about Dhaka
Documentary films about poverty
Documentary films about homelessness
Rainbow Collective films
Films shot in Dhaka
Films directed by Hannan Majid

Films produced by Hannan Majid
2014 independent films
2010s British films